The House of Magic (Thunder and The House of Magic in the United States. French: Le Manoir magique) is a 2013 3D Belgian-French English-language computer-animated fantasy-comedy film produced by Nadia Khamlichi, Adrian Politowski, Ben Stassen, Caroline Van Iseghem and Gilles Waterkeyn and directed by Stassen and Jeremy Degruson. The film focuses on an abandoned young cat who seeks shelter in the home of an old, retired magician with his robots and gizmos.

A spin-off TV series called Presto! School of Magic (formerly School of Magic) was announced in 2017. The series will be produced by TeamTO and Federation Kids and Family.

Plot
While moving to a new home in Boston, a couple stops the car and the woman opens the door and throws a toy ball on the sidewalk so that their tabby ginger cat can chase after it. The kittenish cat, later realizes that he has been left behind by his owners when they close the door and drive away without him. Abandoned, he looks for a refuge. A passing tiny Chihuahua attempts to befriend him but is quickly dragged off by his leash. After various obstacles and near accidents, he's chased by a large Doberman until he comes to an old house with fame of being cursed or haunted in the neighborhood. Entering via an open attic window, the cat explores the strange contraptions about and tries to befriend a small mouse named Maggie, who's terrified of him despite the cat trying to convince her that he doesn't even eat mice. Soon, he is threatened by Jack, Maggie's grumpy rabbit friend, and Maggie; ordering him to leave the house before their owner sees him, afraid the cat will monopolize his love and attention since they're aware of his fondness for cats. They throw the cat out but he finds his way back in through a cellar window, attempting to escape a thunderstorm, then explores the mysterious house further. He hides behind an urn and observes the house's owner, Mr. Lawrence, a kindly old magician, have a conversation with the various automatons and gizmos he's created for his magic shows, whilst attempting to fix an electrical bulb-headed one named Edison (after Thomas Edison). Later, the magician's materialist real estate agent nephew, Daniel, drops by for a visit. Afterwards, while Lawrence dozes off, Jack and Maggie locate the cat after he accidentally re-activates Edison and Jack pursues the kitten. Before Jack can throw him out again, Lawrence wakes up and picks up the kitten and decides to adopt him, naming him Thunder (after his fear of lightning).

Thunder learns more about the house, as well as the romantic pigeon pair named Carlo and Carla. Meanwhile, Jack and Maggie try by all ways to exile Thunder from the house, jealous and afraid of being substituted. The next day, refusing to be left behind, Thunder is incorporated into the "rabbit out of a hat" routine in the magic show performed for some children at a hospital, to much fanfare. Whilst riding back home, a disgruntled Jack and Maggie show their disapproval by attempting to get rid of him once and for all; jabbing sharpened crayons, they poke Thunder off the trunk strapped to the back of the bicycle. During the ensuing mayhem, Lawrence suffers an accident and is sent to the hospital, as Thunder is left sprawled behind.

With Lawrence in the hospital with a broken leg, his nephew Daniel takes advantage by tricking his uncle to sign over power of attorney, in the hopes of putting his house up for sale. Suspicious of Daniel's intentions, Thunder alerts Lawrence's automatons. When Daniel returns his uncle's magic trunk back home, he brings along two possible buyers for the property. Desperate, Thunder gets Carlo and Carla to dive bomb and splatter poop on them in order to attempt deter and prevent the house from being sold. Meanwhile, once out the trunk, Jack (who broke his leg in the accident) and Maggie convince the automatons (except Edison) of Thunder's guilt in causing the accident despite Thunder trying to tell the truth. He hopes Carlo and Carla will prove his innocence, which fails when they are intimidated by Jack. Nevertheless, Thunder manages to convince everyone that they need him to save the house since Daniel is proven to be severely allergic to cats. They allow him to stay but lock him in a bird cage. The next possible buyer, the Chihuahua's owner, is also driven away but not before the Chihuahua is able to rescue Thunder. In a misunderstanding, Daniel's assumed to be harming her dog, whilst in fact attempting to trap the cat. Later, Thunder visits Lawrence at the hospital and is pleased to discovers Lawrence never blamed him after all. Thunder returns home and the inhabitants of the house have meanwhile driven two more buyers away believing the house to be haunted. When Jack and Maggie again try to exile Thunder, the truth of the accident is revealed and they all stand up for Thunder. An infuriated Daniel attempts various increasingly aggressive and bizarre ways to get rid of Thunder, but is foiled at every turn. His latest attempt involves a gun and leads him to believe that he finally got rid of Thunder only to get kicked out of the house by his uncle's toys in retaliation for Thunder's supposed "death." Lawrence also discovers Daniel's deceit and tries to leave the hospital. Meanwhile, Thunder (revealed to have survived), Jack, Maggie, and the rest of Lawrence's toys are in a race against time to save the house before Daniel destroys it using a wrecking ball.

When Lawrence rushes back from the hospital with the help of some of the children he met there and finds his nephew swinging a wrecking ball, he finally discovers Daniel's true colors. Meanwhile, Jack is stuck midway in the cat-flap of the front door, as Thunder attempts to save all the automatons from getting crushed. When he saves Maggie's life, Thunder finally earns the mouse's respect and friendship. They band together and use Daniel's cat-allergy against him until he ends up wrecking balling his own beloved car instead. Lawrence orders Daniel to make repairs on the house. Thunder is finally accepted as a member of the family by Jack and Maggie. When Lawrence recovers from his injuries, he returns to entertaining children with his magic shows, in which Thunder now has his own starring part alongside Jack and Maggie. Thunder is finally happy to have a family that appreciates him and his Chihuahua friend seeing them all having so much fun attempts to get himself "an audition" to get recruited as part of the team.

In a post credit scene, Daniel is attempting to convince a new client to sell her house and move to a retirement home but soon learns that she has many, many cats and sneezes violently.

Cast
 Cinda Adams as Nurse Baxter
 George Babbit as Jack / Carlo / Zoltar
 Brianne Siddall (credited as Murray Blue) as Thunder / Dylan
 Kathleen Browers as Carla
 Joey Camen as Chihuahua
 Grant George as Daniel
 Shanelle Gray  as Maggie
 Nina Grillo as Audrey
 Kyle Hebert as Mark Matthews
 Goldie Jonsie as Old Lady
 Kendra Leif as Lasondra
 Joey Lotsko as Mr. Eames
 Millie Mup as Mrs. Eames
 Will Parks as Mike Matthews
 Sage Sommer as Izzy
 Michael Sorich as Crane Operator
 Doug Stone as Lawrence Savile
 Joseph W. Terry as Reggie Willis

Reception

Critical response
On Rotten Tomatoes, the film has a score of 73% based on reviews from 30 critics, with an average rating of 5.97/10. The website's critics consensus reads: "Thunder and the House of Magic lacks real narrative depth, but its visual splendor offers sufficient compensation for younger viewers." At Metacritic, which assigns a weighted average score out of 100 to reviews from mainstream critics, the film received an average score of 47 based on 13 reviews, indicating "mixed or average reviews".

Box office
The film grossed $64,193,114 overseas outside of North America as well as $4,091 within it for a combined gross of $64,197,205.

References

External links

2013 films
2013 3D films
2013 computer-animated films
2013 comedy films
2013 fantasy films
2010s French-language films
2010s English-language films
2010s German-language films
2010s French animated films
2010s fantasy comedy films
2010s American films
2010s British films
3D animated films
Animated films about cats
Animated films about dogs
Animated films about rabbits and hares
Belgian animated films
Belgian fantasy comedy films
Animated films about magic
Animated films about mice
Films set in Boston
Films set in Massachusetts
Films set in the Great Recession
Films scored by Ramin Djawadi
French fantasy comedy films
French-language Belgian films
StudioCanal films
StudioCanal animated films